The Thief of Always is a novel by Clive Barker that was published in 1992. The book is a fable written for all ages. Its cover was created by Barker, and the book contains several black and white illustrations by him.

Plot

Harvey Swick is an 11-year-old boy bored with school, teachers, homework, and his day-to-day life. A man named Rictus visits Harvey and tells him about a kids’ paradise called the Holiday House. At the Holiday House, there are all the sweets a person could ask for; four seasons in a day; Halloween every evening; Christmas, with whatever gifts you could wish for every night; and everything else you could dream of. Harvey hesitantly visits the house and becomes friends with two other children staying alongside him, Wendell and Lulu. There is also an elderly woman, Mrs. Griffin, who cooks all the meals and cares for the children; though she seems kind, she appears to be keeping a secret about the house and its creator, Mr. Hood. Mrs Griffin also keeps three cats: Stew Cat, Blue Cat and Clue Cat. Clue Cat is accidentally killed by being burned alive from the lunch Mrs Griffin had been cooking, which distresses her. Harvey thinks his parents will be worried about him, so is allowed to speak to them on the phone. Harvey’s parents tell him they thought it would be a good idea for him to take a break from school to cheer him up. Though Harvey thinks the voices of his parents are a bit strange, he brushes it off and starts to relax. 

Harvey eventually meets Jive, the brother of Rictus. Jive and Harvey get along well and he takes Harvey to meet a woman called Marr, who uses her hands to make his face into a scary mask for Halloween, and turns his whole body into a monster. Harvey has fun, scaring Wendell, and returns to his human form when Halloween is over. 

Harvey eventually discovers that Mr. Hood has been stealing the youth of the children staying in the Holiday House by sucking their souls away and turning them into Fish, then being imprisoned in a lake. The lake is full of large fish (who are really the young victims of Mr Hood) all from different times. Lulu is turned into a fish and must live in the lake, but Harvey and Wendell flee the house by following Blue Cat through the mist barrier that constantly surrounds the property at night.

When both Harvey and Wendell come home, they soon discover that for every day they had spent in the Holiday House one year had passed in the rest of the world. Having spent thirty-one days at the Holiday House, it is now thirty-one years since Harvey came to the Holiday House. As such, when Harvey returns home, he finds his parents are elderly. Harvey asks his parents about the phone call they shared on his first day in the Holiday House, but they tell him they never spoke and that he has been a missing person for thirty-one years. He tells his parents what happened and they search for the House, but Harvey has forgotten all the roads he took coming home. 

Harvey meets Wendell again, and Wendell tells Harvey that Wendell's mother is old, fat, and divorced. They decide that the only way to regain their lost time is to return to the Holiday House. They are able to find their way back because there are no adults with them. 

Upon doing so, Harvey learns that Mr Hood runs the entire house on magic and illusions. Mrs Griffen reveals to Harvey that she was the first child to ever come to the Holiday House. At the time, Mrs Griffen’s cat had died and her father refused to get her a new one. Angry, Mrs Griffen ran away, where she was offered to go to the Holiday House. Like Harvey, at first she loved it as she was given three cats (Stew Cat, Blue Cat and Clue Cat) that were promised to live forever. However, soon Mrs Griffen realised the truth. Due to being scared so much of death, Mr Hood offered her a deal where she would serve him and help get other children to come so that they could have their souls stolen, in exchange for sharing immortality with Mrs Griffen. Though she was happy to agree at the time, she would come to regret this and felt immense guilt. 

Harvey defeats Hood by tricking him into using up all of his magic by wishing for as many things he can think of as fast as he can. With his power drained, an exhausted Hood allows Harvey one more wish. Harvey wishes for all the seasons at once, resulting in a storm that destroys the house. Hood seems to perish, but he manages to rebuild a body from the debris of the house, and comments on Harvey's courage. Hood then offers Harvey, whom he calls "A Thief of Always," the chance to become a vampire with him and be immortal. Harvey refuses, and the confrontation ends with Mr. Hood being sucked into the lake, which has turned into a whirlpool. The children all leave the remains of the house to go back to their respective times.

Characters 
Harvey Swick – An 11-year-old boy, who is straw-haired and brown-eyed, and impulsive, is bored with his everyday life and wishes to go to a place that is a kids' paradise. His wish is granted when Rictus enters through the bedroom window and persuades him to come to this kids' paradise known as the Holiday House and agrees to come. When he arrives, Harvey becomes amazed by the magic and wonders the Holiday House possessed. Harvey then discovers when he stays in the world of the Holiday House, all of the years of his life are stolen by Mr. Hood and he himself has realized that he has stolen the lives of children, including one of his friends Lulu, must put an end to all of the dark magic of Mr. Hood, destroy the House and all of its pitiful creatures that hide in its shadows. Harvey is bored and frustrated with his life in the first chapter, but he is very observant, smart, clever, and kind and does everything to help his friends and the children become free from the Holiday House and discovers in the end that there's nothing more powerful than the love of his family and friends and is the brightest child in the story.
Rictus – One of four servants of Hood's and the brother of Jive. Rictus is six inches taller than Harvey, wears gentlemen's clothes, a tall brim hat, and wears spectacles. He is very thin, has yellowish skin, and has a grin that can stretch wider than any grin, resembling the bizarre Cheshire Cat from Alice's Adventures in Wonderland. Rictus's name means "a fixed grimace or grin." Rictus's downfall occurs when Mr. Hood twists his head off due to being annoyed by Rictus.
Jive – One of four servants of Hood's and the brother of Rictus. Jive's downfall occurs when he attempts to change Harvey's mind to stay at the Holiday House with pie and ice cream. Harvey tricks him by saying that the food is not real, but Jive unwillingly eats both plates of the pie and ice cream, which causes him to fall down and crawl on the stairs as he spews dirt and dust out of his mouth screaming for his master's help, and suddenly turns to a pile of dirt and dust. Jive's name means "deceitful or worthless".
Marr – One of four servants of Hood's and the sister of Rictus and Jive. A grotesquely overweight female who is said to resemble a slug. Marr possesses the unique ability to manipulate human flesh into whichever shape she desires (similar to how one would mold clay). Marr's downfall occurs when Harvey forces her to see herself as the wretched slob that she is. Marr melts into a puddle of brackish, fleshy liquid. Marr's name is similar to the word "mar" which means to "impair the appearance of; disfigure."
Carna – One of four servants of Hood's. Carna's name could be alluding to the words "carnage" or "carnivore". Carna is not a human. Carna's death occurs when Harvey pets its head and comforts it, ultimately being killed by kindness.
Wendell – A naive, obnoxious boy who loves to be in the Holiday House and becomes friends with Harvey. At some point in the book, he becomes obese due to the food in the house, and wants to stay in the house, but ultimately leaves when the house burns down.
Lulu – A girl about the same age as Harvey, who has been there longer than both he and Wendell. She has a room full of Christmas presents, as she has been there for months. She eventually has her soul taken by Mr. Hood.
Mrs. Griffin – The housekeeper, and a fantastic cook. She has been there longer than anyone and seems to know more than she lets on. 
Mr. Hood – The creator of the Holiday House and a part of the house.
The Holiday House – The place where every day is perfect, and children can go to live out the rest of their lives if they are not careful.
Blue Cat – Owned by Mrs. Griffin, who according to Mrs. Griffin, "has a good sense of direction" and helped Harvey and Wendell leave the holiday house. Blue Cat also dies because once Wendell and Harvey leave, Mr. Hood kills it.
Clue Cat – Owned by Mrs. Griffin, who happened to die during lunch from burning alive due to a number of factors. Clue Cat has a tail shaped like a question mark, hence its name.
Stew Cat – Owned by Mrs. Griffin.

Reception
The Thief of Always has received positive reviews from both critics and casual readers alike. The book has an approximate 4.20 out of 5 stars on Goodreads.

Publishers Weekly described the book as "both cute and horrifying", noting its similarity to Grimm's Fairy Tales.

Kirkus Reviews accused Barker's "studiously simple narration" of lacking in spirit.

Adaptations
The Thief of Always has been adapted as a bimonthly three-part comic book, published between January 2005 and May 2005, by IDW Publishing.

References

External links

 Revelations – Official Clive Barker website for adults – Includes a full bibliography, filmography and frequently updated news
 The Beautiful Moment – The Official Clive Barker Website for All Ages – For younger readers – Features Abarat and The Thief of Always
 Portfolio - The Thief of Always – Gallery of illustrations made for the book

1992 British novels
1992 fantasy novels
Children's fantasy novels
Novels by Clive Barker
British children's novels
British fantasy novels
IDW Publishing titles
HarperCollins books
1992 children's books